Vedran Gerc (born 14 February 1986) is a Croatian footballer who plays for Orijent 1919 in the Croatian Second Football League.

Club career

Youth career
Vedran began his footballing career in 2000 with the junior teams of HNK Rijeka. He made appearances in the various juvenile tournaments for the Rijeka-based side.

Ljubljana
Soon after he was promoted to the senior side of the Rijeka-based side, he moved on a one-year loan deal to the Slovenian PrvaLiga side, FC Ljubljana. He scored one goal in eight appearances in the 2004–05 Slovenian PrvaLiga.

Orijent
After his short sting in Slovenia, he moved back to Croatia where he was sent on loan to Treća HNL side, NK Orijent. He scored 19 goals in 20 appearances in his two years for the Rijeka-based side.

Rijeka
Impressed with his display away from the club, the HNK Rijeka management decided to promote the local youngster to the senior side. He scored one goal in six appearances in the
2008–09 Croatian First Football League season which came on 22 April 2009 in a 1–0 win over HNK Šibenik.

He made his first appearance in the 2009–10 Croatian First Football League season on 26 July 2009 in a 6–0 win over NK Lokomotiva  and scored his first goal of the season on 9 August 2009 in a 3–1 win over NK Zagreb. He also scored a hat-trick on 10 April 2010 in a 5–1 win over NK Međimurje, taking his goal tally to five goals in 14 appearances.

He made eleven appearances in his final season for HNK Rijeka.

Zadar
In mid-2011, he signed a short-term contract with Zadar-based NK Zadar. He made his official debut for the club on 22 July 2011 in a 1–1 draw against NK Lučko and made only three appearances for the side in the top division.

Karlovac
After a short spell with NK Zadar, he signed a short-term contract with another 1. HNL side, NK Karlovac. He made his official debut and scored his first goal for the club on 21 March 2012 in a 3–1 win over RNK Split. Gerc has scored one goal in six appearances for the club.

Kedah
He first moved out of Croatia in 2012 to Malaysia where he signed a one-year contract with Kedah-based team, Kedah FA. He scored his first goal in the Malaysia Super League which was a brace on 17 April 2012 in a 2–0 away win over Sarawak FA. He scored 6 goals in 10 appearances in the 2012 Liga Super.

Žalgiris
He moved back to Europe and more accurately to Lithuania in 2013 where he signed a short-term contract with FK Žalgiris. He made his A Lyga debut on 12 March 2013 in a 2–1 loss against FK Atlantas and scored his first goal in the competition on 21 April 2013 in a 4–2 win over FK Banga Gargždai.

Tirana
In late 2013, he moved to Albania and more accurately to the capital city Tirana where he signed a short-term contract with KF Tirana. He made his Albanian Superliga debut on 18 September 2013 in a 2–0 loss against KF Vllaznia Shkodër. A horrific injury at the end of the first half against KF Bylis Ballsh forced to the Croatian to end his spell with the Albanian side.

Pomorac
After various stints across Europe and Asia, he moved back to Croatia and more accurately to Rijeka where he signed a one-year contract with the 2. HNL side NK Pomorac 1921. He made his 2. HNL debut on 2 March 2014 in a 0–0 draw against HNK Segesta and scored his first goal in the competition on 19 March 2014 in a 2–2 draw against HNK Cibalia.

Al-Hussein
He moved to Jordan in 2014 where he signed a six-month contract with the Jordan Premier League side Al-Hussein SC. Soon after his arrival at the Irbid-based club, he scored a hat-trick on 4 April 2015 in a 3–0 win over Al-Ramtha SC. He scored ten goals in 16 appearances for the Jordanian side.

Sohar
In 2015, he moved to Oman where he signed a one-year contract with Sohar-based team, Sohar SC. He made his Oman Professional League debut and scored his first goal in the competition on 14 September 2015 in a 2–1 win over Sur SC. He also scored a hat-trick on 28 October 2015 in a 4–2 win over Muscat Club. He was adjudged the top scorer of the 2015–16 Oman Professional League scoring 14 goals in 20 appearances.

Al-Suwaiq
He was on a radar of various clubs across the Sultanate after impressing with his scoring ability in his first season in the Oman Professional League, before Al-Suwaiq Club managed to sign him on 29 November 2016. The management decided to part ways with the Croatian striker after a series of poor performances in which he could manage to score only three goals in ten appearances.

Muscat
Realizing his potential upfront, another Omani side Muscat Club announced the signing of Gerc until the end of the 2016–17 Oman Professional League season. He scored nine goals in eleven appearances for the Muscat-based club in the 2016–17 season, becoming the club top scorer.

Club career statistics

References

External links

1986 births
Living people
Footballers from Rijeka
Association football forwards
Croatian footballers
Croatia youth international footballers
HNK Rijeka players
NK Ljubljana players
HNK Orijent players
NK Zadar players
NK Karlovac players
Kedah Darul Aman F.C. players
FK Žalgiris players
KF Tirana players
NK Pomorac 1921 players
Al-Hussein SC (Irbid) players
Sohar SC players
Suwaiq Club players
Muscat Club players
Al-Seeb Club players
NK Ankaran players
Slovenian PrvaLiga players
Second Football League (Croatia) players
Croatian Football League players
Malaysia Super League players
A Lyga players
Kategoria Superiore players
First Football League (Croatia) players
Oman Professional League players
Croatian expatriate footballers
Expatriate footballers in Slovenia
Croatian expatriate sportspeople in Slovenia
Expatriate footballers in Malaysia
Croatian expatriate sportspeople in Malaysia
Expatriate footballers in Lithuania
Croatian expatriate sportspeople in Lithuania
Expatriate footballers in Albania
Croatian expatriate sportspeople in Albania
Expatriate footballers in Jordan
Croatian expatriate sportspeople in Jordan
Expatriate footballers in Oman
Croatian expatriate sportspeople in Oman